An impossible bottle is a bottle containing an object that does not appear to fit through the bottle's mouth. 

The ship in a bottle is a traditional and the most iconic type of impossible bottle. Other common objects include fruits, matchboxes, decks of cards, tennis balls, racketballs, Rubik's Cubes, padlocks, knots, and scissors. These may be placed inside the bottle using various mechanisms, including constructing an object inside the bottle from smaller parts, using a small object that expands or grows inside the bottle, or molding the glass around the object.

Ship in a bottle

There are two ways to place a model ship inside a bottle. The simpler way is to rig the masts of the ship and raise it up when the ship is inside the bottle. Masts, spars, and sails are built separately and then attached to the hull of the ship with strings and hinges so the masts can lie flat against the deck. The ship is then placed inside the bottle and the masts are pulled up using the strings attached to the masts. The hull of the ship must still be able to fit through the opening. Bottles with minor distortions and soft tints are often chosen to hide the small details of the ship such as hinges on the masts. Alternatively, with specialized long-handled tools, it is possible to build the entire ship inside the bottle.

The oldest surviving ships in a bottle were crafted by Giovanni Biondo at the end of the eighteenth century; two, at least, reproduce Venetian ships of the line. These are quite large and expensive models: the bottles (intended to be displayed upside down, with the neck resting on a small pedestal) measure about 45 cm. The oldest (1784) is in a museum in Lübeck; another (1786) is held by a private collector; the third (1792), that apparently reproduces the heavy frigate PN Fama, is in the Navy Museum in Lisbon. Another old model (1795), from an unknown builder, is kept in a museum in Rotterdam.

Ships in bottles became more popular as folk art in the second half of the nineteenth century, after the introduction of cheap, mass-produced bottles made with clear glass.

A significant collection of ships in bottles is the Dashwood-Howard collection held by the Merseyside Maritime Museum.

Small objects that expand naturally
One variation of the impossible bottle takes advantage of pine cones opening as they dry out. In constructing the display, a closed, green cone of suitable size is inserted into a narrow-mouthed bottle and then allowed to dry inside the bottle.

Fruits and vegetables inside bottles are grown by placing a bottle around the blossom or young fruit and securing it to the plant. The fruit then grows to full size inside the bottle. This technique is used to put pears into bottles of pear brandy (most famously the French eau de vie Poire Williams).

Penny in a bottle
A US one-cent coin sealed inside a small bottle is a common souvenir. They are mass-produced using glassblowing techniques, by placing a coin inside a semi-molten glass cup, and then reshaping the open end into a narrow neck and mouth, completing the bottle. Non-metallic objects need to be protected from the hot glass to prevent scorching, for example with a fireproof cloth.

See also
 Bonsai Kitten
 Chinese puzzle ball

References

External links

Folk Art in Bottles

Bottles
Mechanical puzzles